Moniruzzaman (born 15 January 1990) is a Bangladeshi first-class cricketer who plays for Chittagong Division.

See also
 List of Chittagong Division cricketers

References

External links
 

1990 births
Living people
Bangladeshi cricketers
Chittagong Division cricketers
People from Chittagong